James John O'Brien (born 28 September 1987) is a professional footballer who plays as a central midfielder for Notts County. His previous clubs include Motherwell and Ross County in Scotland, and Barnsley and Coventry City in England. 

Born in Scotland, he represented Ireland at youth international level.

Club career

Celtic and loans
Raised in Dumbarton, O'Brien began his career in the youth system at Celtic. He was loaned out to Dunfermline Athletic during the 2006–07 season. He made his debut in their 3–2 Scottish Cup victory over Rangers on 7 January 2007. He scored his first goal in Dunfermline's 4–1 victory over Motherwell on 7 May 2007.

He made his debut Celtic in a 2–1 victory over Gretna on 7 October 2007; he filled in as a right-back due to all of Celtic's recognised players in that position being injured.

O'Brien joined Dundee United on loan on 31 January until May 2008.

Motherwell

On 8 August 2008, O'Brien signed for Motherwell. He scored four goals in 64 league appearances for Motherwell, earning selection for the PFA Scotland team of the year in 2009–10.

Barnsley
On 7 May 2010, O'Brien signed a pre-contract agreement with English Championship side Barnsley, then under the stewardship of Mark Robins. He scored his first goal for the club during a 5–2 win againstLeeds United at Oakwell in September 2010. As of 5 April 2013, O'Brien had scored five and assisted eight goals for Barnsley. In May 2014, O'Brien rejected a new contract offer from Barnsley.

Coventry City
O'Brien completed a move to Coventry City  on a two-year contract on 4 July 2014. He made his league debut on the opening day of the 2014–15 season in a 3–2 defeat to Bradford City. He scored a disputed first goal for the club against Sheffield United at Sixfields (later credited as an own goal by Blades defender Bob Harris). His second goal for the club was less disputable as he scored from close-range to make the score 2–2 against Peterborough United at the Ricoh Arena on 25 October 2014; the Sky Blues went on to win the game 3–2.

On 15 February 2016, O'Brien was loaned out to Scunthorpe United on an emergency basis.

Shrewsbury Town and Ross County
On 17 June 2016, O'Brien completed a move to League One side Shrewsbury Town. He signed a two-year deal arriving as a free agent following his release from Coventry. A first-team regular during the first half of the season, he scored his first goal for the club in an FA Cup second-round replay against Fleetwood Town. 

On 18 January 2017, O'Brien joined Scottish Premiership side Ross County on loan from Shrewsbury until the end of the 2016–17 season. He made his debut for the club as a substitute in a Scottish Cup fourth-round tie against Dundee United, scoring the final goal in a 6–2 victory.

He left Shrewsbury by mutual consent in July 2017, despite having a year left to run on his contract. then signed a two-year contract with Ross County.

Bradford City and Notts County 
In September 2018 he signed a short-term contract with Bradford City. He left the club in January 2019.

On 8 January 2019, O'Brien signed for Notts County the same day he was released by Bradford City. He was released at the end of the 2018–19 season, but rejoined the club on 1 August 2019.

On 11 May 2021, O'Brien scored his first  career hat-trick in Notts County's 4–0 win away at Maidenhead United.

International career
Although O'Brien represented the Republic of Ireland at under-19 and under-21 levels, he opted to switch allegiances and represent the nation of his birth, citing a chance to work with Craig Levein, who he also worked with while at Dundee United.

Career statistics

See also
List of sportspeople who competed for more than one nation

References

External links
  
 
 
 

1987 births
Living people
Sportspeople from Dumbarton
Footballers from West Dunbartonshire
Barnsley F.C. players
Celtic F.C. players
Coventry City F.C. players
Dundee United F.C. players
Dunfermline Athletic F.C. players
Scunthorpe United F.C. players
Association football wingers
Motherwell F.C. players
Shrewsbury Town F.C. players
Ross County F.C. players
Republic of Ireland association footballers
Republic of Ireland youth international footballers
Republic of Ireland under-21 international footballers
Scottish people of Irish descent
Scottish footballers
Scottish Premier League players
English Football League players
Scottish Professional Football League players
People educated at Our Lady & St Patrick's High School
Bradford City A.F.C. players
Notts County F.C. players
Scotland youth international footballers
National League (English football) players
Association football midfielders